Thymiatris allocrossa is a moth in the family Xyloryctidae. It was described by Turner in 1902. It is found in Australia, where it has been recorded from Queensland.

The larvae feed on the foliage of Elattostachys xylocarpa.

References

Thymiatris
Moths described in 1902